Cocks is a hamlet in the parish of Perranzabuloe in Cornwall, England. Cocks is southeast of Perranporth.

References

External links
 

Hamlets in Cornwall